Walter Dann (born ) is a Canadian Wheelchair Athletics Athlete who has competed in the 1968, 1972 and the 1976 Summer Paralympics. He won silver in the Men's 4x60m Wheelchair Relay (with F. Henderson, B. Simpson and Eugene Reimer) and the Novices 60m Wheelchair Dash C.

He was born in Vancouver, before moving to Halifax, Nova Scotia. He contracted polio when he was three. He won the highest badge in scouting when he was 15.

See also 

Canada at the 1968 Summer Paralympics

References

Athletes (track and field) at the 1968 Summer Paralympics
Athletes (track and field) at the 1972 Summer Paralympics
Athletes (track and field) at the 1976 Summer Paralympics
Medalists at the 1972 Summer Paralympics
Medalists at the 1968 Summer Paralympics
Paralympic silver medalists for Canada
Paralympic track and field athletes of Canada
Living people
Year of birth missing (living people)
Paralympic medalists in athletics (track and field)
Canadian male wheelchair racers